My Best Friend may refer to:

 My Best Friend (2001 film), Greek film
 My Best Friend (2006 film) (Mon Meilleur Ami), French film
 My Best Friend (2018 film) (Mi mejor amigo), Argentine film
 My Best Friend (Skippy the Bush Kangaroo), episode of Skippy the Bush Kangaroo
 "My Best Friend" (Tim McGraw song), released in 1999
 "My Best Friend" (Jefferson Airplane song), released in 1966
 "My Best Friend", song by Annie from Anniemal
 "My Best Friend", song by Weezer from Make Believe
 "my best friend", a song by Yui Horie

Paragraph about best friends